John, Count of Brienne (c. 1235 – c. 1260) was the eldest son of Walter IV of Brienne and Marie of 
Cyprus.

He inherited the County of Brienne on his father's death in 1246, but preferred to live among his mother's relatives at the court of Cyprus, and played little part in international politics. In 1255, he married Marie, Lady of Thieusies (in Hainaut), the daughter of Sohier II of Enghien. They had no children, and when he died, he was succeeded by his brother Hugh.

Brienne, John, Count of
Counts of Brienne
French people of Cypriot descent
Year of birth uncertain